Lauren Wylie McDonald (born August 10, 1968) is an American politician from Georgia. McDonald is a Republican member of Georgia House of Representatives for District 26.

References

Republican Party members of the Georgia House of Representatives
21st-century American politicians
Living people
21st-century American women politicians
1968 births